Malcolm MacDonald (1916–1992) was a British composer. He won the Clements Memorial Prize in 1946 for his Trio in One Movement, which was heard again at a Society for the Promotion of New Music concert on 6 December, 1949. His Symphony No 2 won the Royal Philharmonic Society's Open Prize Competition in 1952. His best-known work (and the only one recorded and still performed in recent times) is the Cuban Rondo for clarinet and orchestra, written in 1960.

He was a regular contributor to The Gramophone magazine, and from the late 1940s a frequent music reviewer and presenter on BBC radio. He has often been confused with the music critic Malcolm MacDonald (1948-2014).

References

External links
 Cuban Rondo, Ian Scott (clarinet), Royal Ballet Sinfonia, cond. Gavin Sutherland

1916 births
1992 deaths
20th-century classical composers
English classical composers
20th-century English composers
English male classical composers
20th-century British male musicians